Anatoli Vladimirovich Sigachyov (born October 4, 1974) is a retired Russian professional football player.

Club career
He played two seasons in the Russian Football National League for FC Metallurg Lipetsk and FC Avangard Kursk.

Honours
 Russian Second Division Zone Center top scorer: 2004 (16 goals).

External links
 

1974 births
People from Tambov Oblast
Living people
Russian footballers
FC Spartak Tambov players
FC Arsenal Tula players
FC Khimik-Arsenal players
FC Metallurg Lipetsk players
Association football forwards
FC Avangard Kursk players
Sportspeople from Tambov Oblast